Riad Alexander Michael, also known as Geyser, is a German electronic musician as well as physician.

After his noticed and critically acclaimed debut album Digger has been published under the Colonian label Mehrwert Records, he has founded his own label Geyser Recordings under which his further studio albums have been released. His productions have been described as original and have influences of different electronica styles such as downtempo, ambient or trance.

Riad Michael has written his medical dissertation concerning the subject of music drawing as psychotherapeutic method in psychogenic and psychosomatic disorders as well as absolved a scientific further education in music therapy.

Discography

As Riad Michael 

Albums
 2009 Ambient I

Singles & EPs
 2008 Abaro
 2009 Snip
 2010 Lights
 2011 Desire

As Geyser 

Albums
 2000 Digger (promo version)
 2001 Digger
 2005 Concrete (featuring Leah)
 2005 Atmosphere
 2006 Digger 2006 (reissue)
 2009 Clean Sweep
 2011 Fifth

Singles & EPs
 2001 Tomi
 2005 Concrete (featuring Leah)
 2006 Anker
 2007 Decision

Compilations
 2010 Selected Downbeat Works 01-09

See also 
List of ambient music artists

References

External links 
 Official Riad Michael website
 Official Geyser website
 Dissertation of Riad Alexander Michael

German record producers
German composers
21st-century German physicians
Music therapists
Living people
Year of birth missing (living people)
Downtempo musicians